ACT New Zealand, known simply as ACT, is a right-wing, classical-liberal political party in New Zealand. According to former party leader Rodney Hide, ACT's values are "individual freedom, personal responsibility, doing the best for our natural environment and for smaller, smarter government in its goals of a prosperous economy, a strong society, and a quality of life that is the envy of the world". Young ACT is an associated (albeit unofficial) student wing.

The name is an acronym of Association of Consumers and Taxpayers, which was founded in 1993 by Roger Douglas and Derek Quigley and became a political party for the 1996 election. An associate of Douglas, Richard Prebble served as party leader from 1996 to 2004. Under Prebble's leadership the party held nine seats in Parliament. Rodney Hide served as leader from 2004 to 2011. ACT was briefly led by former National Party leader Don Brash for the 2011 election, after which the party caucus was reduced to one seat.

It is currently led by David Seymour, who became the party's leader in October 2014 and has been an elected MP of the party since September 2014. During the 2017 election, ACT retained its sole seat in Epsom and received 0.5% of the party vote. Benefiting from the collapse of the National Party vote, ACT won 7.6% of the party vote and 10 seats in the 2020 election, its best result since its founding.

Principles 

ACT states that it adheres to classical-liberal and small (or limited) government principles coupled with what the party considers as a high regard for individual freedom and personal responsibility. ACT sets out its values:
 That individuals are the rightful owners of their own lives and therefore have inherent freedoms and responsibilities.
 That the proper purpose of government is to protect such freedoms and not to assume such responsibilities.
 All people should be equal before the law regardless of race, gender, sexuality, religion or political belief.
 Freedom of expression is essential to a free society and must be promoted, protected and preserved without restriction other than for incitement, criminal nuisance or defamation.
 Citizenship and permanent residency should be subject to applicants affirming New Zealand's values.

Policies and ideology

ACT has been characterised as a classical liberal and libertarian party, although its stances have changed under successive leadership and the party's support base has drawn a big tent and a broad church of voters. ACT's platform featured conservative populist policies under former leaders Richard Prebble (1996–2004) and Rodney Hide (2004–2011). Under the current leadership of David Seymour, commentators have identified a shift in policy to a more libertarian outlook. The party has also been variously defined as subscribing to libertarian conservatism, conservative liberalism, right-wing populism and social conservatism; the latter two of these tendencies have become marginalised at present in the party but still visible among ACT's supporters and grassroots activists. Seymour has stated that he does not view populism as the way to govern a country or stimulate growth, and has accused the centre-left New Zealand Labour Party of engaging in populism in its business, spending and tax policies.

ACT wants to reduce or remove some government programmes which it sees as unnecessary and wasteful, and to increase self-reliance by encouraging individuals to take responsibility to pay for services traditionally paid for by the government. Under leader Rodney Hide, ACT New Zealand had primarily focused on two main policy areas: taxation and crime (law and order issues). At the 2011 general election, ACT advocated lowering tax rates and also supported something approaching a flat tax, in which tax rates would not be graduated based on wealth or income, so every taxpayer would pay the same proportion of their income in tax. The flat tax rate that ACT proposed was approximately 15% with no tax on the first $25,000 for those who opt out of state-provided accident, sickness and healthcare cover. , the party proposes reducing GST and decreasing the marginal tax rate paid by those on the median wage; however it currently does not advocate a flat tax rate.

At the 2020 general election, the party campaigned on a broad policy platform. It prioritised economic recovery, keeping national debt low, and signing up to a CANZUK agreement which would enable free movement of people and goods between the United Kingdom, New Zealand, Canada and Australia. The party wants to protect freedom of expression and limit funding for universities that do not uphold freedom of speech on campus. It supports immigration while it calls for compulsory measures for immigrants to assimilate and limiting citizenship or permanent residency to those who pledge to uphold the values of New Zealand.

Law and order 
On its website, ACT states "that all New Zealanders should have the same fundamental rights, regardless of race, religion, sexuality or gender". The party says "the rights of victims should trump the rights of criminals" and has a number of tough on crime policies focused primarily on trying to control gangs. Party leader, David Seymour, wants to reintroduce the three strikes law repealed by the Labour Government, and even impose three year prison sentences, without parole, on anyone who commits three burglaries. ACT advocates repealing restrictive firearms legislation, and taking a "tougher" stance on criminals who repeatedly offend and those found guilty of violent crimes while supporting rehabilitation programs.

In September 2022, the ACT Party proposed fitting ankle bracelets on young offenders aged between 11 and 14 years old in order to combat juvenile crime particularly ram raiding. Party leader Seymour argued that ankle bracelets were non-intrusive and would allow Police to monitor young offenders. In response, Police Minister Chris Hipkins stated that the Labour Government was not considering the use of ankle bracelets for young offenders but would keep "all options on the table." National Party leader Christopher Luxon and education spokesperson Erica Stanford initially indicated that they would not support ACT's ankle bracelet policy, with Stanford describing it as "heartbreaking." New Zealand rugby league player Sir Graham Lowe criticised the ankle bracelet policy while Waikato retailer Ash Parmer supported it. In November 2022, National reversed its initial opposition to fitting young offenders with ankle bracelets; with justice spokesperson Paul Goldsmith stating that a law change was necessary to impose electronic monitoring or intensive supervision on child offenders aged under 12 years.

Social issues
Members of ACT's caucus in parliament voted five to four in favour of the Civil Union Act 2004 which gave the option of legal recognition to (among others) same-sex couples. A majority also supported the legalisation of brothels by the Prostitution Reform Act 2003. In 2005, both of ACT's MPs, Rodney Hide and Heather Roy, voted for Marriage (Gender Clarification) Amendment Bill 2005 which would have banned possibility of introducing same-sex marriage in New Zealand in the future perspective.

In 2013, leader John Banks (the party's sole MP from 2011 to 2014) voted in favour of the Marriage (Definition of Marriage) Amendment Bill at its third reading, a law which legalised same-sex marriage in New Zealand.

ACT leader David Seymour supported the legalisation of assisted dying. In 2018, he introduced a member's bill, the End of Life Choice Bill which aimed to legalise euthanasia in New Zealand. The law passed in 2019, was approved by the public in a 2020 referendum, and will take full effect in 2021. The euthanasia law has been cited as an example of Seymour's cultural liberal personal outlook. In 2020, Seymour voted for Abortion Legislation Act 2020 which introduced abortion on request. However, he criticised a particular aspect of this law which created "free protest zones" which would ban protests near abortion clinics, saying this limits freedom of expression. 
In 2021, ACT expressed support for liberalisation of surrogacy law so as to facilitate availability of surrogate services to heterosexual and same-sex couples as well. Currently New Zealand's law permits for getting altruistic surrogacy only.

Māori issues
ACT also proposes abolition of the Māori electorates seats in parliament, arguing the seats are "an anachronism and offensive to the principle of equal citizenship" and that Māori MPs have been elected in general elections on other lists without special assistance. The party also wants to reduce the number of MPs in parliament to 100 from 120.

In March 2022, ACT campaigned on holding a referendum on Māori co-governance arrangements as a condition for entering into coalition with the National Party. Seymour has argued that the Treaty of Waitangi was not a partnership between the New Zealand Crown and Māori and that co-governance arrangements created resentment and division. In addition, ACT announced that it would introduce a new law defining the principles of the Treaty of Waitangi if elected into government following the 2023 New Zealand general election. This law would only come into effect following a referendum held at the 2026 general election.   ACT's proposed referendum and law would affect co-governance arrangements at several Crown Research Institutes, state-owned enterprises and healthcare providers such as Te Aka Whai Ora (the Māori Health Authority). However, Seymour indicated that the new law would preserve existing co-governance arrangements with the Waikato, Ngāi Tahu, Tūhoe and Whanganui iwi (tribes).

ACT's proposed co-governance referendum and policies were described by Māori Party co-leader Debbie Ngarewa-Packer and Professor Linda Tuhiwai Smith as being motivated by racism and reflecting a Pakeha unwillingness to share power. Similarly, Waikato leader Rahui Papa claimed that ACT's co-governance policies clashed with the second and third articles of the Treaty which he argued guaranteed Māori participation in the social sector. In response, Prime Minister Jacinda Ardern reiterated her government's commitment to co-governance arrangements. Meanwhile, National Party leader Christopher Luxon refused to commit to a referendum on co-governance but acknowledged that further clarity on co-governance was needed.

In October 2022, ACT released a discussion document entitled "Democracy or co-government?" which proposed a new Treaty Principles Act that would end the focus on partnership between Māori and the Crown and interpret "tino rangatiratanga" solely as property rights. By contrast, most Māori language scholars define "tino rangatiratanga" as the equivalent of self determination in the English language. The Treaty Principles Act also  does not mention Māori, the Crown, iwi (tribes), and hapū (subgroups) but refers only to "New Zealanders."  Party leader Seymour refused to identify whom his party had consulted when developing its co-governance and Treaty of Waitangi policies particularly its redefinition of "tino rangatiratanga" as property rights. As part of ACT's "colour blind" policies, its social development spokesperson Karen Chhour advocated the abolition of Te Aka Whai Ora.

Climate change

ACT went into the 2008 general election with a policy that in part stated "New Zealand is not warming" and that their policy goal was to ensure "That no New Zealand government will ever impose needless and unjustified taxation or regulation on its citizens in a misguided attempt to reduce global warming or become a world leader in carbon neutrality". In September 2008, ACT Party Leader Rodney Hide stated "that the entire climate change - global warming hypothesis is a hoax, that the data and the hypothesis do not hold together, that Al Gore is a phoney and a fraud on this issue, and that the emissions trading scheme is a worldwide scam and swindle." The former party leader has been branded as an "outspoken Kiwi climate change sceptic".  In February 2016, ACT deleted this climate change policy from their website, and party leader David Seymour criticised the Green Party for doing "bugger all for the environment".

ACT placed Chris Baillie fourth on its party list of candidates in the 2020 election; he has received criticism over his views on climate change, and been labelled a climate change sceptic. In a 2020 report by OraTaiao, the independent New Zealand climate and health council, ACT was listed as a party that would "either make climate change worse or do nothing". It finished in 9th place in the council's pre-election scorecard, scoring 1.1 (one point one) out of 24. However, in the runup to the 2020 election, Environmental Defence Society chief executive Gary Taylor said that even ACT had moved its position from where it had been. While he was largely critical of the party, saying "ACT have been very outspoken about wanting to go hard to repeal a lot of climate change legislation, and I haven't seen much from New Zealand First, mainly just silence." He also stated, "I think the only upside from ACT really on climate change is they do seem to have moved from outright deniers - which is where the party was five years ago. [With] a strong ACT presence you could expect some of their radical and unhelpful policies to potentially be implemented, and that is frankly a scary proposition."

In early December 2020, the New Zealand Parliament officially declared a climate emergency, of which ACT was critical, stating, "Today's climate emergency was a triumph for post-rational politics with feelings rather than facts driving the Government's response to climate change". The party supports repealing the 2019 "Zero Carbon Act".

History

Formation 
The name comes from the initials of the Association of Consumers and Taxpayers, founded in 1993 by Sir Roger Douglas and Derek Quigley. Douglas and Quigley intended the Association to serve as a pressure-group promoting Rogernomics—the name given to the radical free-market policies implemented by Douglas as Minister of Finance between 1984 and 1988. The Association grew out of the 'Backbone club', a ginger group in the Labour Party that supported Douglas and his policies. In 1996, New Zealand switched to using the MMP electoral system. The new electoral system gave smaller groups a much better chance of entering Parliament, and encouraged the Association to transform into a political party and contest elections. The nascent party's manifesto was based upon a book written by Douglas entitled Unfinished Business. Douglas served as ACT's first leader, but soon stood aside for Richard Prebble (his old ally from their days in the Labour Party).

1996–2004: Prebble's leadership

Under Douglas, ACT had languished at 1% in opinion polls, but with Prebble's populist rhetoric the party increased in support. Prebble won the electorate, and with 6.10% of the total party vote, ACT also sent seven list MPs to the 45th New Zealand Parliament.

On 2 December 2004, both Douglas and Quigley announced that they would step down as patrons of ACT. They stated as the reason that they wished to have more freedom to disagree with the party publicly.

2005 election 
Prebble's sudden departure from the leadership of ACT in 2004 signalled a decline in the party's electoral fortunes. It obtained 1.51% of the party vote, but due to winning one electorate did not need to obtain the necessary 5% threshold of the party vote and hence had 1 list MP and 1 electorate MP.

2008–2011: First term in government
In the 2008 New Zealand general election, ACT fielded 61 list candidates, starting with Rodney Hide, Heather Roy, Sir Roger Douglas, John Boscawen, David Garrett and Hilary Calvert. The election marked an improvement in ACT's fortunes. Hide retained his Epsom seat and ACT's share of the party vote increased to 3.65% (up from the 1.5% gained in the 2005 election). The combination allowed the party five MPs in total.

In addition, the National Party won the most seats overall, forming a minority government, the Fifth National Government of New Zealand, with the support of ACT as well as the Māori Party and United Future. John Key offered both Hide and Roy posts as Ministers outside Cabinet: Hide became Minister of Local Government, Minister for Regulatory Reform and Associate Minister of Commerce, while Roy became Minister of Consumer Affairs, Associate Minister of Defence and Associate Minister of Education.

After 2008, some caucus MPs and organisational members became dissatisfied with ACT's coalition partner status and argued at ACT's national conference (27 February 2010) that there were insufficient fiscal responsibility policy gains for their party and that the National Party had slid from its earlier commitment to the politics of fiscal responsibility over the course of the previous decade. Throughout 2009, there had been at least one reported ACT caucus coup attempt against Hide's leadership, believed to have been led by Deputy Leader Heather Roy and Roger Douglas. However, it faltered when Prime Minister Key supported Hide's retention and threatened a snap election. In addition, the party's polling of a lowly one to two percent in most opinion polls meant only Heather Roy might accompany Hide after any forthcoming general election, if Hide retained ACT's Epsom pivotal electorate seat.

On 28 April 2011, Hide announced that he was resigning the ACT leadership in favour of former National Party leader and Reserve Bank Governor Don Brash who joined the party that morning. Brash's leadership was unanimously approved by the party board and parliamentary caucus on 30 April. Brash promised to focus the party on controlling government debt, equality between Māori and non-Māori, and rethinking the Emissions Trading Scheme, with a target of getting 15 percent of the party vote in the next election.

In November 2011, a recording of a conversation held between John Key and the former National Party member and former Mayor of Auckland City John Banks, who had been selected as the new ACT candidate in Epsom, was leaked to Herald on Sunday. 3 News also obtained copies of the recording suggesting the two politicians were discussing issues related to ACT New Zealand's leadership. Media dubbed the affair teapot tape.

2011 election: Decline 
In the 2011 New Zealand general election, ACT fielded 55 list candidates, starting with new leader Don Brash, Catherine Isaac, Don Nicolson, John Banks, David Seymour and Chris Simmons. The election was a disappointment for ACT, with the party's worst election result since it began in 1996. John Banks retained the Epsom seat for ACT, however the 34.2% majority held by Rodney Hide was severely cut back to 6.3% as large numbers of Labour and Green voters in Epsom tactically split their vote and gave their electorate vote to the National candidate Paul Goldsmith. Nationwide, ACT received only 1.07% of the party vote, placing eighth out of 13 on party vote percentage. As a result, ACT were only entitled to one seat in the new Parliament, filled by John Banks. Subsequently, Don Brash announced that he had stepped down as leader during his speech on election night. Following the 2011 general election John Banks stated that he believed that the ACT brand "...just about had its use-by date..." and needed to be renamed and relaunched.

Their previous partners, the National Party, again won the most seats overall, and formed a minority government. The Fifth National Government of New Zealand had ACT support as well as that of United Future and the Māori Party, providing the coalition with confidence and supply.

2014 election 

At the ACT Board meeting of 2 February 2014, Jamie Whyte became the party's leader-elect, and David Seymour was made the ACT candidate for Epsom. Kenneth Wang was appointed deputy leader on 15 April 2014. In the September 2014 general election, Seymour won his seat, and ACT moved from seventh to sixth place, despite a decline in their share of the popular vote. Seymour took over as party leader on 3 October 2014.

2017 election 

Wang resigned as deputy leader on 9 July 2017, the same day ACT released its party list; Beth Houlbrooke was announced as his replacement.

The party list had 39 candidates, none of whom were elected. Party leader David Seymour was re-elected in the Epsom electorate, giving the party its only seat.

2020 election: Revival 
In the run-up to the 2020 general election, ACT rose in opinion polls, from under 1% to close to 8%. This rise was attributed to Seymour's personal popularity. Following the election, held on 17 October (postponed from September), ACT increased their share of the popular vote to 7.6%, winning 10 seats including Seymour's Epsom seat and nine from the party list. This is the party's best-ever result. Some political analysists attributed ACT's strong result as partly benefiting from the collapse in support for the National Party and New Zealand First.

2021–present 
In late April 2021, the ACT party sponsored motion asking the New Zealand Parliament to debate and vote on the issue of human rights abuses against the Uyghur ethnic minority community in China's Xinjiang province. In early May, the incumbent Labour Party revised the motion to raise concerns about human rights abuses in Xinjiang but omitting the term genocide, which was subsequently adopted by the New Zealand Parliament on 5 May. In response, the Chinese Embassy claimed that the motion made "groundless accusations" of human rights abuses against China and constituted an interference in China's internal affairs.

On 19 May 2021, the ACT Party opposed Green Party MP Golriz Ghahraman's motion calling for Members of Parliament to recognise the rights of Palestinians to self-determination and statehood while reaffirming its support for a two-state solution to the Israel-Palestine conflict. Deputy Leader Van Velden justified ACT's opposition to the Green motion on the basis of  Green MP Ricardo Menéndez March's tweet that said "From the river to the sea, Palestine will be free!."

Electoral results

Leadership 
The ACT party board appoints a leader and deputy leader recommended by the party caucus; when the party leader is not a member of parliament, a separate parliamentary leader is chosen by the caucus. The organisation outside parliament is led by a party president and party vice-president.

Leaders 
 Roger Douglas (1994–1996)
 Richard Prebble (1996–2004)
 Rodney Hide (2004–2011)
 Don Brash (2011)
 John Banks (2012–2014)
 Jamie Whyte (2014)
 David Seymour (2014–present)

Deputy leaders 
 Ken Shirley (1996–2004)
 Muriel Newman (2004–2006)
 Heather Roy (2006–2010)
 John Boscawen (2010–2011)
 Kenneth Wang (2014–2017)
 Beth Houlbrooke (2017–2020)
 Brooke van Velden (2020–present)

Parliamentary leaders 
 No MPs (1994–1996)
 Richard Prebble (1996–2004)
 Rodney Hide (2004–2011)
 John Boscawen (2011)
 John Banks (2011–2014)
 David Seymour (2014–present)

Presidents 
 Rodney Hide (1994–1996)
 Roger Douglas (1996–2001)
 Catherine Isaac (2001–2006)
 Garry Mallett (2006–2009)
 Michael Crozier (2009–2010)
 Chris Simmons (2010–2013)
 John Boscawen (2013–2014)
 John Thompson (2014–2017)
 Ruwan Premathilaka (2017–2019)
 Tim Jago (2019–2023)

Vice presidents 
 David Schnauer (1999–2000)
 Rodney Hide (2000–2001)
 Vince Ashworth (2001–2004)
 John Ormond (2004–2006)
 Trevor Loudon (2006–2008)
 Michael Crozier (2008–2009)
 Dave Moore (2009–2010)
 Bruce Haycock (2010–2014)
 Beth Houlbrooke (2014–2016)
 Heather Anderson (2016–2017)
 Michaela Draper (2017–2018)
 Beth Houlbrooke (2018–2020)
 Isaac Henderson (2020–2022)
 Henry Lynch (2022–present)

Elected representatives

Current Members of Parliament 

 David Seymour (2014–present)
 Brooke van Velden (2020–present)
 Nicole McKee (2020–present)
 Chris Baillie (2020–present)
 Simon Court (2020–present)
 James McDowall (2020–present)
 Karen Chhour (2020–present)
 Mark Cameron (2020–present)
 Toni Severin (2020–present)
 Damien Smith (2020–present)

Former Members of Parliament 

 Donna Awatere Huata (1996–2003)
 John Banks (2011–2014)
 John Boscawen (2008–2011)
 Hilary Calvert (2010–2011)
 Deborah Coddington (2002–2005)
 Roger Douglas (2008–2011)
 Gerry Eckhoff (1999–2005)
 Stephen Franks (1999–2005)
 David Garrett (2008–2010)
 Rodney Hide (1996–2011)
 Owen Jennings (1996–2002)
 Muriel Newman (1996–2005)
 Richard Prebble (1996–2005)
 Derek Quigley (1996–1999)
 Heather Roy (2002–2011)
 Patricia Schnauer (1996–1999)
 Ken Shirley (1996–2005)
 Kenneth Wang (2004–2005)
 Penny Webster (1999–2002)

Notable candidates

 Stephen Berry (born 1983), politician, political commentator, internet personality, and comedian. Berry was an ACT candidate in 2014, 2017, 2018, and 2020.
 Allan Birchfield (born 1949/1950), coal and gold miner, chairman of the West Coast Regional Council. Birchfield was an ACT candidate in 2011.
 Barry Brill (born 1940), lawyer, politician, parliamentary under-secretary. Brill was an ACT candidate in 2011.
 Bob Clarkson (born 1939), National Member of Parliament. Clarkson was an ACT candidate in 2011.
 Andrew Falloon (born 1983), National Member of Parliament. Falloon was an ACT list candidate in 2005 and 2008.
 Jo Giles (born 1950), television presenter and representative sportswoman. Giles was an ACT candidate in 2005.
 Catherine Isaac, president of ACT New Zealand, managing director of Awaroa Partners, former director of JM Communications. Isaac was an ACT list candidate in 2011.
 John Lithgow (1933–2004), National Member of Parliament. Lithgow was an ACT candidate in Whanganui in 1996.
 Garry Mallett (born 1960/1961), politician, fourth President of ACT New Zealand, former owner-operator of a Hamilton branch of Les Mills International. Mallett was an ACT candidate in Hamilton West in 1996, Hamilton East in 2005, Hamilton East in 2008.
 Dick Quax (1948–2018), Dutch-born New Zealand runner, one-time world record holder in the 5000 metres, and local-body politician. Quax was an ACT candidate in 1999 and 2002.
 Graham Scott (born 1942), official of the New Zealand government. Scott was an ACT candidate in 2005.
 Bhupinder Singh (born 1986), Indian-born cricketer. Singh was an ACT candidate in 2017.

See also

 Historic liberalism in New Zealand
 List of libertarian political parties
 Rogernomics

References

External links 

 ACT New Zealand
 ACT on Campus ACT's Youth Wing
 
 Is this the end of the road for Act? - New Zealand Herald article

 
1994 establishments in New Zealand
Political parties established in 1994
Political parties in New Zealand